
Letipea Lighthouse (Estonian: Letipea tuletorn) is a lighthouse located in Letipea Point, Viru-Nigula Parish, Lääne-Viru County, in Estonia.

The lighthouse has a height of fifteen metres.

See also 
 List of lighthouses in Estonia

References

External links 
 

Lighthouses completed in 1951
Resort architecture in Estonia
Lighthouses in Estonia
Viru-Nigula Parish
Buildings and structures in Lääne-Viru County